was a Japanese film director and screenwriter.

Career
Born in Osaka, Ōmori studied at Kyoto Prefectural University of Medicine and held a license to practice medicine. While in school, he began making films independently, with Kuraku naru made matenai! (1975), which featured Seijun Suzuki, receiving particularly high praise. His script "Orenji rōdo kyūkō" won the 3rd Kido Award for screenplays in 1977, and the next year he was able to film that in his professional debut. Several of his films, such as the 1980 Hipokuratesu-tachi, feature doctors or rely on his knowledge of medicine.  He has worked in a variety of genres, including suspense films, musicals, and most famously abroad, several contributions to the Heisei Godzilla series.

Ōmori also participated in the formation of Director's Company in 1982, an independent production company founded by nine directors, including Kiyoshi Kurosawa, Sōgo Ishii, Shinji Sōmai, and Kazuhiko Hasegawa. In 2000, he became a professor at Osaka Electro-Communication University, and in 2005, a professor at Osaka University of Arts. He was also a special guest at G-Fest XIII in 2006.

Personal life and death
Ōmori died from acute myeloid leukemia on 12 November 2022, at the age of 70.

Filmography

Film and television

References

External links
 
 
 

1952 births
2022 deaths
Deaths from acute myeloid leukemia
Japanese film directors
Japanese screenwriters
Kyoto Prefectural University of Medicine alumni
People from Osaka